The 2006 Formula Toyota season was the 17th season of this racing class.

Drivers
All cars are Bridgestone shod Toyota FT30 cars with a Toyota 4A-GE engine.

Event calendar and results

Final standings

External links
 Schedule and results for the 2006 season

Formula Toyota
Formula Toyota